The Statute Law Revision Act 1950 is an Act of the Parliament of the United Kingdom.

This Act was partly in force in Great Britain at the end of 2010.

The enactments which were repealed (whether for the whole or any part of the United Kingdom) by this Act were repealed so far as they extended to the Isle of Man on 25 July 1991.

Section 1
This section was repealed by section 1 of, and the First Schedule to, the Statute Law Revision Act 1953.

Section 2
The words "to the court of the county palatine of Lancaster or" in this section were repealed by section 56(4) of, and Part II of Schedule 11 to, the Courts Act 1971. This section was repealed by section 32(4) of, and Part V of Schedule 5 to, the Administration of Justice Act 1977.

Section 3
Section 3(1) from "the Union" to "Ceylon" and the word "Burma" was repealed by Group 1 of Part XVI of Schedule 1 to the Statute Law (Repeals) Act 1993.

Section 3(2) was repealed by Group 1 of Part IX of Schedule 1 to the Statute Law (Repeals) Act 1998.

Section 5
Section 5(3) was repealed by Group 1 of Part XVI of Schedule 1 the Statute Law (Repeals) Act 1993.

Section 5(4) was repealed by section 41(1) of, and Part I of Schedule 6 to, the Northern Ireland Constitution Act 1973.

First Schedule
This Schedule was repealed by section 1 of, and the First Schedule to the Statute Law Revision Act 1953.

Section 3 of the Statute Law Revision Act 1953 provides that the sections specified in the first column of the Fourth Schedule to that Act have effect, and are deemed always to have had effect, as if the references in this Schedule, to the words and subsection respectively referred of those sections which are specified in the second column of the Fourth Schedule to that Act had been omitted from this Act.

Second Schedule
This Schedule was repealed by section 1 of, and the First Schedule to the Statute Law Revision Act 1953.

Third Schedule
This Schedule was repealed by section 1 of, and the First Schedule to the Statute Law Revision Act 1953.

See also
Statute Law Revision Act

References
Halsbury's Statutes. Fourth Edition. 2008 Reissue. Volume 41. Page 759.
Current Law Statutes Annotated 1950. Part 1. Sweet & Maxwell. Stevens and Sons. W Green & Son.
The Public General Acts and Church Assembly Measures of 1950. Her Majesty's Stationery Office. 1950.
HL Deb vol 166, cols 197 to 199 (second reading), HC Deb vol 475, col 1480 to 1481

External links

United Kingdom Acts of Parliament 1950